Prior to the 2015 United Kingdom general election, various polling organisations conducted opinion polling in specific constituencies. The results of publicised opinion polling for individual constituencies are detailed in this article. However, most opinion polling covers Great Britain, where the results are published in this article here.

Opinion polls were conducted gradually from the months after the previous general election held on 6 May 2010, and increased in frequency before the general election which took place on 7 May 2015. Though most opinion polls published are for general election voting intention, some polls shown are for voting intention in separate by-elections.

Polls of individual constituencies are expensive compared to national polling and were previously an infrequent practice in the UK. However, a large number of individual constituency polls were carried out in this period, most commissioned from independent polling providers by Lord Ashcroft, a Conservative peer and sponsor. In addition to polls listed in this article, other polling of constituencies has been carried out in private, often by political parties.
 
Given the expense of polling individual constituencies, constituencies are usually only polled if they are of some particular interest, e.g. they are thought to be marginal or facing an impending by-election. The constituencies polled are not necessarily representative of a national average swing. Under the first-past-the-post electoral system true marginal seats are, by definition, decisive as to the election outcome.

Constituency polls

England

Amber Valley

Bedford

Bermondsey and Old Southwark

Berwick-upon-Tweed

Birmingham Edgbaston

Birmingham Yardley

Blackpool North and Cleveleys

Bognor Regis and Littlehampton

Bolton West

Boston and Skegness

Bradford East

Brent Central

Brentford and Isleworth

Brighton Kemptown

Brighton Pavilion

Bristol North West

Bristol West

Broxtowe

Burnley

Bury North

Camborne and Redruth

Cambridge

Cannock Chase

Carlisle

Carshalton and Wallington

Castle Point

Cheadle

Cheltenham

Chippenham

City of Chester

Clacton

Cleethorpes

Colchester

Colne Valley

Corby

Crewe and Nantwich

Croydon Central

Derby North

Dewsbury

Doncaster North

Note: Michael Ashcroft initially published incorrect results for his 18–23 Nov 2014 poll, erroneously showing only a small Labour lead.  The corrected poll results are below.

Dover

Dudley North

Dudley South

Ealing Central and Acton

Eastbourne

Eastleigh

Elmet and Rothwell

Enfield North

Erewash

Finchley and Golders Green

Folkestone and Hythe

Gloucester

Great Grimsby

Great Yarmouth

Halesowen and Rowley Regis

Halifax

Hampstead and Kilburn

Harlow

Harrogate and Knaresborough

Harrow East

Hastings and Rye

Hazel Grove

Hendon

Heywood and Middleton

High Peak

Hornsey and Wood Green

Hove

Ipswich

Keighley

Kingston and Surbiton

Kingswood

Lancaster and Fleetwood

Lewes

Lincoln

Loughborough

Manchester Withington

Mid Dorset and North Poole

Milton Keynes South

Morecambe and Lunesdale

Morley and Outwood

Newark

Newton Abbot

North Cornwall

North Devon

North East Cambridgeshire

North East Somerset

North Warwickshire

Norwich North

Norwich South

Nuneaton

Oxford West and Abingdon

Pendle

Plymouth Moor View

Plymouth Sutton & Devonport

Portsmouth South

Redcar

Rochester and Strood

Rother Valley

Sheffield Hallam

1: These figures represent the results when respondents were presented with named candidates. When asked to think only about the political parties [the methodology used by the Ashcroft polls] the figures showed a small Labour lead.

Solihull

Southampton Itchen

South Basildon and East Thurrock

South Swindon

South Thanet

South West Surrey

St Austell and Newquay

Stevenage

Stockton South

Stroud

Sutton and Cheam

Thurrock

Torbay

Twickenham

Warwick & Leamington

Watford

Weaver Vale

Wirral West

Witney

Worcester

Wyre Forest

Wythenshawe and Sale East

Northern Ireland

Belfast East

Scotland

Airdrie and Shotts

Ayr, Carrick and Cumnock

Berwickshire, Roxburgh and Selkirk

Coatbridge, Chryston and Bellshill

Cumbernauld, Kilsyth and Kirkintilloch East

Dumfries and Galloway

Dumfriesshire, Clydesdale and Tweeddale

Dundee West

East Dunbartonshire

East Renfrewshire

Edinburgh North and Leith

Edinburgh South

Edinburgh South West

Glasgow Central

Glasgow East

Glasgow North

Glasgow North East

Glasgow North West

Glasgow South

Glasgow South West

Gordon

Inverness, Nairn, Badenoch and Strathspey

Kirkcaldy and Cowdenbeath

Motherwell and Wishaw

North East Fife

Paisley and Renfrewshire South

Ross, Skye and Lochaber

West Aberdeenshire and Kincardine

West Dunbartonshire

Wales

Brecon and Radnorshire

Cardiff Central

Cardiff North

Carmarthen West and South Pembrokeshire

Vale of Glamorgan

Multiple constituency polling
Some polls are carried out in specified subsets of marginal constituencies. Most of the polls for Lord Ashcroft were compilations of polls in individual constituencies.

Explanatory notes
The Lord Ashcroft polls typically ask two voting intention questions, with the second question asking the respondent to think "specifically about your own constituency and the candidates who are likely to stand there". This latter question is reported in the tables above.

Most polling companies are members of the British Polling Council and abide by its disclosure rules; however, Michael Ashcroft, who commissioned many of these polls, is not a BPC member, despite having been invited to join. However, he contracts the conduct of his polls to BPC members.

See also
List of political parties in the United Kingdom
List of United Kingdom by-elections (1979–present)

Notes

References

P – The dates when the fieldwork for this poll was carried out is unknown, therefore the date of publication has been given.

External links
Ipsos Mori archive of all pollsters' polls
British Polling Council
Electoral Calculus
UK Polling Report Blog
UK Polling Report – 2015 Election Guide
ICM Polls
Populus Polls
Political Polls
ComRes Polls
Angus Reid Public Opinion

2015 United Kingdom general election
2015